"If You Wanna Be Happy" is a 1963 song recorded by Jimmy Soul, written by Rafael de Leon and adapted by Joseph Royster, Carmella Guida and Frank Guida.

Background
"If You Wanna Be Happy" is based on the song "Ugly Woman" by the Trinidadian calypsonian Roaring Lion (writing credited to his real name, Rafael de Leon), recorded in 1934. It hit #1 on the Hot 100 on May 18, 1963, as well as on the R&B singles chart. It was issued on Frank Guida's S.P.Q.R. label and distributed by London Records, and in the United Kingdom on EMI's Stateside label.

The original single lists a running time of 2:14; some later releases are slightly longer due to an extended fade-out. It was banned on many radio stations due to the use of the words "Ugly Girl/ Woman."

Towards the end of the track, a brief dialogue takes place between Soul and a backup singer, based on Bo Diddley's song "Say Man": "Say Man!!"/ "Hey baby."/ "I saw your wife the other day."/ "Yeah??"/ "Yeah, and she's ugly-y-y-y-y!!!"/ "Yeah, she's ugly, but she sure can cook, baby."/ "Yeah, alright."/ Soul's counterpoint melody in a falsetto is heard as the song fades out.

Covers 

Trini Lopez in 1963, on the live album By Popular Demand More Trini Lopez At P.J.'s.
Former Rolling Stones bassist Bill Wyman, on his solo album Stone Alone, in 1976.
Joe Dolce, in 1981, as the follow-up to his international hit single "Shaddap You Face". It reached the top 40 in New Zealand and #7 in Austria.
Kid Creole and the Coconuts, The Dovells, Racey, The Skatalites, Randy Meisner and Barnes & Barnes have also released versions.
Rocky Sharpe and the Replays covered this song as their last chart hit, in 1983.
Dr. Victor & The Rasta Rebels covered the song in 2009.
Jensen Ackles performed a parody version for the Amazon series The Boys in 2022.

References

1963 singles
Jimmy Soul songs
Billboard Hot 100 number-one singles
Cashbox number-one singles
Songs written by Frank Guida
1963 songs
London Records singles